ASCOM can refer to:

Ascom (company), the Swiss telecommunication company
Ascom Group, Moldovan oil and gas company 
ASCOM (standard) is a standard for communicating with observatory equipment